The Sega Zone, also known as Sega Reactor is a dedicated video game console released under license from Sega (through AtGames) in summer 2010. It has 20 built-in classic games from the Mega Drive/Genesis library. Of these 20 games, 16 of them have motion-control enabled. When released, it cost £49 in the UK.

Games
20 licensed Sega Mega Drive games

Kid Chameleon
Chakan: The Forever Man
Shinobi III: Return of the Ninja Master
Sonic & Knuckles
Sonic the Hedgehog Spinball
Alex Kidd in the Enchanted Castle
Comix Zone
Altered Beast
Arrow Flash
Bonanza Bros.
The Ooze
Crack Down
Dr. Robotnik's Mean Bean Machine
Ecco the Dolphin
ESWAT: City Under Siege
Fatal Labyrinth
Flicky
Gain Ground
Golden Axe
Jewel Master

16 Interactive Sports Games from the Zone 40

 Darts
 Curling
 Tennis
 Swimming
 Sword Of Warrior
 Fishing
 Badminton
 Super Shoot
 Baseball
 Golf
 Bowling
 Ping Pong
 Boxing
 Football
 Fencing
 Beach Volleyball

14 Arcade Games (Mega Drive games produced by TecToy, Microlab and AtGames)

 Jack's Pea
 Mahjong
 Warehouse Keeper
 Memory
 Spider
 Naval Power
 Mr Balls
 Cannon
 Bottle Taps Racer
 Bomber
 Checker
 Hexagonos
 Air Hockey
 Fight & Lose

References

 

2010s toys
Products introduced in 2010
Zone
Zone
Zone